Carduus tenuiflorus, known variously as slender-flower thistle, sheep thistle, shore thistle, slender thistle,  winged plumeless thistle, winged slender thistle and winged thistle, is a species of flowering plant in the family Asteraceae. It is native to Europe and North Africa, and an introduced species elsewhere.

Description
Carduus tenuiflorus may exceed  in height. Its tall stem is ridged with wings and has long spines which may be several centimeters in length. The dull olive-green leaves are lobed and wrinkled and may fold and crease themselves.

The inflorescences may hold up to 20 flower heads which are somewhat rounded, covered in wide, spiny phyllaries, and packed with pale pink to bright purple long-tubed disc florets. This is a tenacious weed of roadsides, fields, and disturbed areas.

Distribution
Carduus tenuiflorus is native to western North Africa in: northern Algeria; Morocco; and Tunisia, and much of Europe in: Belgium; France, including Corsica; Ireland; Italy, including Sardinia and Sicily; the Netherlands; Portugal, Spain, including the Baleares (Balearic Islands); and the United Kingdom.

Introduced species
It has become naturalised in Macaronesia, South Africa, India, Australasia, Southern South America, regions of the United States, and elsewhere. It is an invasive species in California.

References

External links

Jepson Manual Treatment
Carduus tenuiflorus — CalPhoto gallery

tenuiflorus
Flora of Europe
Flora of North Africa
Plants described in 1793
Flora of Algeria
Flora of Belgium
Flora of Corsica
Flora of Ireland
Flora of Italy
Flora of Sardinia
Flora of Sicily
Flora of Morocco
Flora of the Netherlands
Flora of Portugal

Flora of Spain
Flora of the Balearic Islands

Flora of Tunisia
Flora of the United Kingdom